The  was a mixed-use residential and office tower in Shimbashi, Tokyo, Japan designed by architect Kisho Kurokawa. Completed in two years from 1970 to 1972, the building was a rare remaining example of Japanese Metabolism (alongside the older Kyoto International Conference Center), an architectural movement emblematic of Japan's postwar cultural resurgence. It was the world's first example of capsule architecture ostensibly built for permanent and practical use. The building, however, fell into disrepair. Around thirty of the 140 capsules were still in use as apartments by October 2012,  while others were used for storage or office space, or simply abandoned and allowed to deteriorate.  As recently as August 2017 capsules could still be rented (relatively inexpensively, considering the Ginza locale), although the waiting list was long.

In 2022, demolition of the building was initiated. Attempts to raise funds to save it and campaigns to preserve it as a historic landmark were unsuccessful.  The tower was scheduled to be disassembled starting April 12, 2022, with component units repurposed. The building was disassembled, not merely torn down.



Design and construction

The building is composed of two interconnected concrete towers, respectively eleven and thirteen floors, which house 140 self-contained prefabricated capsules. Capsules can be connected and combined to create larger spaces. Each capsule is connected to one of the two main shafts by only four high-tension bolts and is designed to be replaceable. Although the capsules were designed with mass production in mind, none of the units have been replaced since the original construction.

The capsules were fitted with utilities and interior fittings before being shipped to the building site, where they were attached to the concrete towers. Each capsule was attached independently and cantilevered from the shaft, so that any capsule could be removed easily without affecting the others. The capsules are all-welded lightweight steel-truss boxes clad in galvanized, rib-reinforced steel panels which were coated with rust-preventative paint and finished with a coat of Kenitex glossy spray after processing.

The cores are rigid-frame, made of a steel frame and reinforced concrete. From the basement to the second floor, ordinary concrete was used; above those levels, lightweight concrete was used. Shuttering consists of large panels the height of a single storey of the tower. In order to make early use of the staircase, precast concrete was used in the floor plates and the elevator shafts. Because of the pattern in which two days of steel-frame work were followed by two days of precast-concrete work, the staircase was completely operational by the time the framework was finished. On-site construction of the elevators was shortened by incorporating the 3-D frames, the rails, and anchor indicator boxes in the precast concrete elements and by employing prefabricated cages.

The original target demographic was bachelor Tōkyō salarymen. The compact pieds-à-terre included a wall of appliances and cabinets built into one side, including a kitchen stove, a refrigerator, a television set, and a reel-to-reel tape deck. A bathroom unit, about the size of an aircraft lavatory, was set into an opposite corner. A large circular window over the bed dominated the far end of the room. Optional extras such as a stereo were also originally available.

The architect says that this building reflects that asymmetry is part of the Japanese tradition.

Construction occurred both on- and off-site. On-site work included the two towers with their energy-supply systems and equipment, while the capsule parts were fabricated and assembled at a factory. Nobuo Abe was a senior manager, managing one of the design divisions on the construction of the Nakagin Capsule Tower.

Demolition and update proposals

The capsules can be individually removed or replaced, but at a cost: when demolition was being considered in 2006, it was estimated that renovation would require around 6.2 million yen per capsule.  The original concept was that individual capsules would be repaired or replaced every 25 years; but the capsules deteriorated since the repairs were never done.

80% of the capsule owners must approve demolition, which was first achieved on April 15, 2007. A majority of capsule owners, citing squalid, cramped conditions as well as concerns over asbestos, voted to demolish the building and replace it with a much larger, more modern tower. In the interest of preserving his design, Kurokawa proposed taking advantage of the flexible design by "unplugging" the existing boxes and replacing them with updated units. The plan was supported by the major architectural associations of Japan, including the Japan Institute of Architects; but the residents countered with concerns over the building's earthquake resistance and its inefficient use of valuable property adjacent to the high-value Ginza. Kurokawa died in 2007, and a developer for renovation has yet to be found, partly because of the late-2000s recession.

Opposing slated demolition, Nicolai Ouroussoff, architecture critic for The New York Times, described Nakagin Capsule Tower as "gorgeous architecture; like all great buildings, it is the crystallization of a far-reaching cultural ideal. Its existence also stands as a powerful reminder of paths not taken, of the possibility of worlds shaped by different sets of values."

The hot water to the building was shut off in 2010. In 2014 Masato Abe, a capsule owner, former resident and founder of the "Save Nakagin Tower" project stated that the project attempted to gain donations from around the world to purchase all of the capsules and preserve the building.

In May 2021, a number of outlets reported that the management company of the building had voted to sell the complex to the original landowner, reigniting speculation over potential demolition and redevelopment. As of November 2021, the building houses 20 tenants.  An attempt to sell it to a new owner fell through.

The demolition of the tower began on April 12, 2022. Some individual capsules may be preserved or recycled.

Digital archive

Demolition of the Nakagin Capsule Tower Building began on April 12, 2022. Since the building is regarded as a masterpiece of Metabolist architecture, a project team led by Gluon has launched a 3D digital archiving project to preserve the entire building in 3D data in order to preserve its architectural value. In this project, the entire building was scanned using a combination of laser scan data that accurately measures distances in millimeters and more than 20,000 photographs taken by cameras and drones. Augmented reality of the Nakagin Capsule Tower Building was also unveiled.

In popular culture
 Nakagin Capsule Tower was featured in the 2013 superhero film The Wolverine as a love hotel in Hiroshima Prefecture.
In the 2015 miniseries Heroes Reborn, Hachiro Otomo and Miko Otomo (Katana Girl) were shown to live in a building with a similar exterior to Nakagin Tower.
A building inspired by the Nakagin Capsule Tower appears in the 1994 video game Transport Tycoon.
 Three documentaries have mentioned the tower as well:
 Residents of the Nakagin Tower were interviewed in the 2010 documentary Japanese Metabolist Landmark on the Edge of Destruction.
 Kisho Kurokawa was filmed in the tower for Kochuu (2003), directed by Jesper Wachtmeister, in which he expresses the opinion that "In the background there is still invisible Japanese tradition". He admires the Nakagin capsule tower as the first of capsule architecture built for permanent and practical use. The film explores the influence and origins of Modernist Japanese architecture.
 Kurokawa was also filmed in the tower for Kisho Kurokawa: From Metabolism to Symbiosis (1993).
 Photographer Noritaka Minami published 1972, a photo book of the decaying tower, in 2016.
A building inspired by the Nakagin Capsule Tower appears in the 1972 film Godzilla vs. Gigan.
The tower was featured in the music video for "Behind My Eyes" by the Belgian electronic music producer Apashe.

See also 
 Capsule hotel
 Sharifi-ha House

Notes

References

Noboru Kawazoe, et al. (1960). Metabolism 1960: The Proposals for a New Urbanism. Bitjsutu Shuppan Sha.
Kisho Kurokawa (1992). From Metabolism to Symbiosis. John Wiley & Sons. 
Thomas Daniell (2008). After the Crash: Architecture in Post-Bubble Japan. Princeton Architectural Press.

Further reading

External links

 Kisho Kurokawa portfolio entry
 Photos of Nakagin Capsule Tower
 3D Digital Archive

Articles containing video clips
Buildings and structures completed in 1972
Buildings and structures demolished in 2022
Buildings and structures in Chūō, Tokyo
Ginza
Kisho Kurokawa buildings
Landmarks in Japan
Visionary environments